Three's a Crowd is a 1932 Warner Bros. Merrie Melodies cartoon directed by Rudolf Ising. The short was released on December 10, 1932.

Plot
An old, bespectacled gentleman, an open volume in his hands, sits in his library, in a rocking chair, in his stocking feet, comfortably before a warm fire. A clock above the mantle strikes (the face apparently reading about five, but the number of rings indicating eight) and the gentleman, rising, sets the open book down on his seat; yawning and stretching, he makes his way across the room, a well-used, lit taper in his hand, which he sets on a table near the threshold, extinguishing the flame with a great breath as he exits. We cut back to the rocker and the open book, Alice in Wonderland, out of which who should emerge but Alice herself! Up leaps the tiny girl to the arm of the chair, up she leaps to a nearby table, the which she runs across until she meets a radio, whose great dial she adjusts with some effort. The song of the title comes through, our little heroine swaying and scatting her way through it. Merrily she rolls along, skipping and sliding past some untidily shelved volumes, out of one of which, Robinson Crusoe, emerges some accompaniment, likely Robinson himself and Friday. Meanwhile, Rip Van Winkles book snores away; the cover is pushed away by Rip, apparently awakened by and much enjoying the music. Alice trots along, coming across The Three Musketeers, whose cover she pries open: "All for one and one for all," cry Athos, Porthos, and Aramis, raising their rapiers as they segue into their own scatting-routine. Cut to Robinson, Friday, Napoleon, and Omar Khayyam, who stand amongst the books bobbing about happily to the tune.

There is a universal burst of applause as the musketeers conclude their number: Henry VIII, surrounded (presumably) by some of his wives, shouts "Whoopee!" Nearby, Marc Antony crawls out of Antony and Cleopatra, shouting, as if in Julius Caesar, "Friends, Romans, countrymen...lend your ears to that dear old maestro!" The camera pans to a portly Emperor Nero, who stands before a book containing an image of the Great Fire of Rome and holds his iconic, anachronistic fiddle. He plays an exotic tune: Cleopatra comes dancing out of her book, looking like an Egyptian tomb-painting. Alice skips over to Uncle Tom's Cabin, summoning its title character: Uncle Tom sings Stephen Foster's Old Black Joe as well as "I've Got the South in my Soul," the other characters his chorus (Alice occasionally interjecting, "O Lord!") Snarling, Mr. Hyde peeps out from his book, meaning trouble as he clutches one of the skull-shaped book-ends that contain his volume: he snatches Alice as the song concludes; on a high shelf, Tarzan takes notice, crying valorously as he swings down to the table by way of a couple of pull switches. The manly figure stands in Hyde's way, prompting the cad to turn and run: Robinson and Friday snatch up a nearby fountain pen as Hyde comes close and they spray his devilish face full of black ink. In an effort to clean himself, Hyde ejects Alice only to find, once he can see again, that two Roman soldiers are advancing towards him with a lit pipe; as they gain on their adversary, one of the soldiers blows into the tail of pipe, scalding Hyde's bottom with a breath of fire. Robin Hood loads his tiny bow with a match whose tip, as Robin pulls back his string, rubs against the coarse side of its box, igniting as it hurtles towards the villain; Hyde runs away in a panic as projectile after projectile thus flies at him: but, again, the fiend has nowhere to run, for, in the other direction, the musketeers are loading steel pen-points into a pencil sharpener, winding the sharpener's crank in order to fire the nibs as though bullets from a gatling. Overwhelmed, Hyde leaps into a small hinged box nearby and, as he cowers there, four of the characters shut the lid and carry the box away in the fashion of pall-bearers; a dirge plays as they drop the ersatz coffin from the edge of the table into a waste-paper basket at its foot. The ensemble cheers!

Relation to other Warner Bros. shortsThree's a Crowd''' is the first Warner Bros. cartoon to feature the theme of literary characters' coming to life and escaping their books, one famously revisited in 1937 and 1938 by Frank Tashlin in Speaking of the Weather, Have You Got Any Castles?, and You're an Education and by Robert Clampett in 1946's Book Revue''.

References

External links
 Three's a Crowd on YouTube (unrestored)

Merrie Melodies short films
1932 films
1932 animated films
Films directed by Rudolf Ising
Films scored by Frank Marsales
1930s Warner Bros. animated short films